The Punjab Highway Department (Urdu,) constructs and maintains the provincial highways in Punjab, Pakistan. Currently, the Punjab Highway Department maintains more than 38,000 kilometers of roads.

Division 

The Punjab Highway Department is divided into four wings, Highway (North Zone), Highway (South Zone), Highway (Central Zone), and Highway (Maintenance & Repair). Highway M&R executes routine and special repair of provincial roads while other three departments are responsible for rehabilitation, reconstruction of existing roads, construction of new roads, and maintenance and construction of bridges and culverts in the province. Each wing is headed by a Chief Engineer.

See also
Provincial Highways of Punjab

References

External links 
 Punjab Highway Department

Roads in Punjab, Pakistan
Road authorities
Pakistani road authorities